Utengule Usongwe is an administrative ward in the Mbeya Rural district of the Mbeya Region of Tanzania. In 2016 the Tanzania National Bureau of Statistics report there were 46,236 people in the ward, from 41,952 in 2012.

Villages and hamlets 
The ward has 5 villages, and 38 hamlets.

 Magulula
 Ilonjelo
 Lena - Mtakuja
 Mfinga
 Muungano
 Nengelesa
 Ujora
 Mpolo
 Ihanga 'A'
 Ihanga 'B'
 Ihanga 'C'
 Mahango 'A
 Mahango 'B'
 Mahango 'C'
 Muungano
 Ijumbi
 Itambo Mpolo
 Kajunjumele
 Lyanumbusi
 Mahango Mswiswi
 Majojolo
 Marawatu
 Misufini
 Senganinjala
 Shuleni
 Ugandilwa
 Simike
 Mapula 'A'
 Mapula 'B'
 Mapululu
 Miambeni
 Mianzini
 Shuleni
 Tengatenga
 Wambilo
 Utengule Usangu
 Iduya A
 Iduya B
 Jemedari
 Ubajulie - Mbela
 Ujola
 Ulyankha
 Wimbwa

References 

Wards of Mbeya Region